Krasnokamensk Urban Settlement is the name of several municipal formations in Russia.

Krasnokamensk Urban Settlement, a municipal formation which the Work Settlement of Krasnokamensk in Kuraginsky District of Krasnoyarsk Krai is incorporated as
Krasnokamensk Urban Settlement, a municipal formation which the town of Krasnokamensk and the settlement of Oktyabrsky in Krasnokamensky District of Zabaykalsky Krai are incorporated as

See also
Krasnokamensk (disambiguation)

References

Notes

Sources

